Symbolic modeling is a therapeutic and coaching process developed by psychotherapists Penny Tompkins and James Lawley, based on the work of counselling psychologist David Grove. Using Grove's clean language, a progressive questioning technique using clients' exact words, the facilitator works with a client's self-generating metaphors to clarify personal beliefs, goals, and conflicts, and to bring about meaningful change. Because of its reliance on emergence and self-organization it has been called a "post-modern oriented therapeutic approach".

Background
The practice of symbolic modeling is built upon a foundation of two complementary theories: the metaphors by which we live, and the models by which we create. It regards the individual as a self-organizing system that encodes much of the meaning of feelings, thoughts, beliefs, experiences etc. in the embodied mind as metaphors. Symbolic modeling aims to heighten awareness of clients' personal "symbolic domain of experience", facilitating them to develop a unique "metaphor landscape" and to explore their internal metaphors, which in conceptual metaphor theory are seen to govern behavior.

Intent
The symbolic modeling process guides the client through an exploration of the client's own metaphors, their organization, interactions, and patterns. These embodied metaphors can restrict a client's ways of viewing the world and his or her coping strategies, due to the inner logic prescribed by the metaphors. Without shifting these metaphors, lasting change may be difficult, as the embodied mind may continue to work within the constraints of this old paradigm. Through the facilitation, the client can discover how these metaphors can change to meet their desired outcomes, transformative shifts can occur within a client's "metaphor landscape", bringing about meaningful change on cognitive, affective and behavioral levels.

The "metaphor landscape" phenomenon is not a new discovery, with some similarities to "waking dream" or rêve evéillé, a term coined by Robert Desoille in the 1930s.

Process
Symbolic modeling proceeds through five defined stages, as follows:
Stage 1: Entering the symbolic domain
Stage 2: Developing symbolic perceptions
Stage 3: Modeling symbolic patterns
Stage 4: Encouraging transformation
Stage 5: Maturing the evolved landscape

Clean language is used throughout, to avoid contaminating or distorting the developing metaphor landscape through the form, content or presentation of the therapist's questions.

A more structured subset of the above process called symbolic modeling lite is used in coaching:
Phase 1: Set up
Phase 2: Identify a desired outcome 
Phase 3: Develop a desired outcome landscape
Phase 4: Explore effects of desired outcome landscape
Phase 5: Mature changes as they occur
Phase 6: Set down

Evidence base
A number of studies have assessed the efficacy of symbolic modeling with 95 dyslexic coachees; in a psychotherapy case study; and in an organisational setting.

Other applications
While therapy and coaching are the primary application areas of symbolic modeling, researchers have started to apply the method to metaphor research, game design, problem solving, and as a qualitative research methodology.

Notes

References
 Akbari, M. (2013). Metaphors about EFL Teachers' Roles: A Case of Iranian Non-English-Major Students, International Journal of English Language & Translation Studies, Vol: 1, Issue: 2, July–September. doaj.org/article/c0279baf69cd424da2720d3d43673e0f
 Doyle, N. & McDowall, A (2015). Is coaching an effective adjustment for dyslexic adults? Coaching: An International Journal of Theory, Research and Practice 8(2): 154-168. doi:10.1080/17521882.2015.1065894
 Groppel-Wegener, A. (2015). Design Tasks Beyond the Studio. Proceedings of the 3rd International Conference for Design Education Researchers Volume 1 pp. 93–108 Editors: Robin Vande Zande, Erik Bohemia & Ingvild Digranes. DOI: 10.13140/RG.2.1.1200.7520 academia.edu/13300548/Proceedings_of_the_3rd_International_Conference_for_Design_Education_Researchers_volume_1
Lakoff, G. and Johnson, M. (1980). Metaphors We Live By. Chicago, IL: University of Chicago Press.
 Lawley, J & Tompkins, P (2011). Chapter 4 of Innovations in NLP: Innovations for Challenging Times, L.Michael Hall & Shelle Rose Charvet (eds.) Crown House Publishing. 
 Lawley, J & Tompkins, P (2000). Metaphors in Mind: Transformation through Symbolic Modelling: London: The Developing Company Press 
 Martin, J. N.T. (2007). Book Review: Metaphors in Mind: Transformation Through Symbolic Modelling, Metaphor and Symbol, 22(2):201-211. doi:10.1080/10926480701235510
 Needham-Didsbury, I (2012). The Use of Figurative Language in Psychotherapy, University College London, Working Papers in Linguistics 2012, pp. 75–93. /psychlangsci/research/linguistics/publications/wpl/12papers/needham 
 Nehyba, J. & Lanc, J. (2013). Koncept čistého jazyka v psychoterapii (The Concept of Clean Language in Psychotherapy), Psychoterapie: praxe – inspirace – konfrontace, 7(2):123-133 Brno: Masaryk university. http://psychoterapie.fss.muni.cz/clanky/koncept-cisteho-jazyka-v-psychoterapii
 Rees, J. & Manea, A.I. (2016). The Use of Clean Language and Metaphor in Helping Clients Overcoming Procrastination. Journal of Experiential Psychotherapy 19(3): 30-36. jep.ro/images/pdf/cuprins_reviste/75_art_5.pdf
 Robinson, F. (2012/2013). How does exploring metaphorical representations of organisational change at its best affect levels of well-being in an ambiguous and rapidly changing public sector work environment? Paper presented to The Third International Neuro-Linguistic Programming Research Conference, Hertfordshire University, 6–7 July 2012. A precised version appeared in Acuity No. 4, 2013, available at: cleanlanguage.co.uk/articles/articles/332/
 Rusch, D. C. (2017). Making Deep Games – Designing Games with Meaning and Purpose. CRC Press Taylor & Francis Group.
 Tosey, P., Lawley, J. & Meese, R. (2014). Eliciting Metaphor through Clean Language: An Innovation in Qualitative Research. British Journal of Management, 25: 629–646. 
 van Helsdingen, A. & Lawley, J. (2012). Modelling Shared Reality: avoiding unintended influence in qualitative research, Kwalon: Journal of the Netherlands Association for Qualitative Research. Vol 3, October. academia.edu/attachments/30371322/ translated from the original Dutch version https://www.tijdschriftkwalon.nl/inhoud/tijdschrift_artikel/KW-17-3-43/

Psychotherapy
Coaching